Phalanx is an unincorporated community located within Colts Neck Township in Monmouth County, New Jersey, United States. It is located near the Swimming River Reservoir and is across from Brookdale Community College in Lincroft. The community is named for the North American Phalanx, a communal agricultural community that existed in the 19th century. The community disbanded in 1854 following a fire but the main residence stood until November 14, 1972 when another fire destroyed it. Homes began to replace the former farmland beginning in the late 1970s and is now the primary composition of the area.

References

Colts Neck Township, New Jersey
Unincorporated communities in Monmouth County, New Jersey
Unincorporated communities in New Jersey